Mohamed Farrah Hassan Aidid (15 December 1934 – 1 August 1996) was a Somali general and diplomat.

Educated in both Rome and Moscow, he served as a chief in the Italian colonial police force and later as a brigadier general in the Somali National Army. He would eventually became chairman of the United Somali Congress (USC), and soon after the Somali National Alliance (SNA). Along with other armed opposition groups, he succeeded in toppling President Siad Barre's 22 year old regime following the outbreak of the Somali Civil War in 1991.

Aidid possessed aspirations for presidency of the new Somali government, and would begin to seek alliances and unions with other politico-military organizations in order to form a national government.

Following the June 5, 1993 attack on the Pakistanis, the SNA - and by extension Aidid, would be blamed for the death of 25 UNOSOM II peacekeepers, causing him to become one of the first "Wanted Men" of the United Nations. After the US led July 12, 1993 Abdi House raid, which resulted in the death of many eminent members of his Habr Gidr clan, Aidid would begin deliberately targeting American troops for the first time, which would lead President Clinton to implement Operation Gothic Serpent and deploy Delta Force and Task Force Ranger to capture him. The ensuing disastrous Battle of Mogadishu on October 3–4, 1993, would lead UNOSOM to finally relent in its four month long attempt to capture him.

In 1995, Aidid declared himself president of Somalia. He was killed the following year in Mogadishu on August 1, 1996.

Early years

Aidid was born in 1934 in the town of Beledweyne, Italian Somaliland. He is from the noble Sa’ad, Habar Gidir subclan of Hawiye. During the era of the British Military Administration he moved to Galkayo in the Mudug region to stay with a cousin, a policeman who would teach Aidid to both type and speak in Italian.

Soon after, during the period of the Italian ruled UN trusteeship, a young Aidid enlisted in the Corpo di Polizia della Somalia (Police Corps of Somalia) and in 1954 he was sent to Italy to be trained at an infantry school in Rome, after which he was appointed to work under several high ranking Somali police officers. In 1958 Aidid would serve as Chief of Police in Banaadir Province, and the following year he returned to Italy to receive further education. In 1960, Somalia gained independence and Aidid joined the newly formed Somali National Army. He was promoted to lieutenant and became aide-de-camp of Maj. Gen. Daud Abdulle Hirsi, the first commander of the Somali National Army.

Requiring more formal training, Aidid, having been recognized as a highly qualified officer, was selected to study advanced post graduate military science at the Frunze Military Academy (Военная академия им. М. В. Фрунзе) in the Soviet Union for three years, an elite institution reserved for the most qualified officers of the Warsaw Pact armies and their allies.

October 1969 Coup d'état, Imprisonment and Ogaden War 
In 1969, a few days after the assassination of Somalia's President Abdirashid Ali Sharmarke, a military junta known as the Supreme Revolutionary Council (SRC), led by Major General Mohamed Siad Barre, would take advantage of the disarray and stage a bloodless coup d'état on the democratically elected Somali government. At the time Aidid was serving as Lieutenant Colonel in the army with 26th Division in Hargeisa. He was also the Head of Operations for the Central and Northern Regions of Somalia. After the assassination, he was relieved of his duties and was recalled to Mogadishu to lead the troops guarding the burial of the deceased President. By November 1969, he had quickly fallen under suspicion by high ranking members of the Supreme Revolutionary Council, including Barre. Without trial, he was subsequently detained in Mandhera Prison along with Colonel Abdullahi Yusuf Ahmed for nearly six years. Both Colonel Aidid and Yusuf were widely regarded to be politically ambitious officers, and potential figureheads in a future coup attempt. Aidid claimed that his imprisonment was a result of encouraging President Barre to transfer power over from the Somali military to civilian technocrats. 

Aidid was eventually released in October 1975, and he returned to service in the Somali National Army to take part in the 1977-1978 Ogaden War against Ethiopia. During the war he was promoted to brigadier general and became an aide-de-camp to President Mohammed Siad Barre. Headquartered in Hargeisa, Brig Gen Aidid and Maj Gen Gallel would command the 26th Division on the Dire Dawa Front. After the war, having served with distinction, Aidid worked as a presidential staffer to Barre before being appointed intelligence minister.Under pressure from President Barre, Aidid gave a written guarantee in 1978 that Col Abdullahi Yusuf would not attempt a coup d'eat. Yusuf would go on to break the pledge in a failed coup attempt and escaped to Ethiopia. Aided was left stranded but was rescued by a high ranking ally in the regime, and was consequently saved from any punishment.

Somali Rebellion and Civil War

In 1979, Barre appointed Aidid to parliament, but in 1984, after perceiving him as a potential rival, sent him away to India by making Aidid the ambassador for Somalia. 
 
He would use his time in the country to frequently attend lectures at the University of Delhi and with the aid of Indian lecturers at the University of Delhi, completed three books (A Vision of Somalia, The Preferred Future Development in Somalia and Somalia from the Dawn of Human Civilization to Today) .

United Somali Congress 
By the late 1980s, Barre's regime had become increasingly unpopular. The State took an increasingly hard line, and insurgencies, encouraged by Ethiopia's communist Derg administration, sprang up across the country. Being a member of the Hawiye clan, a high ranking government official and an experienced soldier, Aidid was deemed a natural choice for helping lead the military campaign for the United Somali Congress against the regime, and he was soon persuaded to leave New Delhi and return to Somalia. Aidid defected from the embassy to India in 1989 and then left the country to join the growing opposition against the Barre regime. Following his defection, he had received an invitation from Ethiopian President Mengistu Haile-Mariam, who would go on to give Aidid permission to create and run a USC military operation from Ethiopian soil. From base camps near the Somali-Ethiopian border, he began directing the final military offensive of the newly formed United Somali Congress to seize Mogadishu and topple the regime.

The USC was at that time split into three factions: USC-Rome, USC-Mogadishu, later followed by USC-Ethiopia; as neither the first two former locations were a suitable launching pad to topple the Barre regime. Ali Mahdi Mohamed, an influential member of the congress who would later become Aidids prime rival, opposed Aidids involvement in the USC and supported the Rome faction of the Congress, who also resented Aidid. The first serious signs of fractures within the USC came in June 1990, when Mahdi and the USC-Rome faction rejected the election of Aidid to chairman of the USC, disputing the validity of the vote. That same month Aidid would go on to form a military alliance with the northern Somali National Movement (SNM) and the Somali Patriotic Movement (SPM). In October 1990, the SNM, SPM and USC would sign an agreement to hold no peace talks until the complete and total overthrow of the Barre regime. They further agreed to form a provisional government following Barres removal, and then to hold elections.

By November 1990, the news of Gen. Aidid's USC forces overrunning President Siad Barres 21st army in the Mudug, Galgudud and Hiran regions convinced many that a war in Mogadishu was imminent, leading the civilian population of the city to begin rapidly arming itself. This, combined with actions of other rebel organizations, eventually led to the full outbreak of the Somali civil war, the gradual breakup of the Somali Armed Forces, and the toppling of the Barre regime in Mogadishu on 26 January 1991. Following the power vacuum left by the fall of Barre, the situation in Somalia began to rapidly spiral out of control, and rebel factions subsequently began to fight for control of the remnants of the Somali state. Most notably, the split between the two main factions of the United Somali Congress (USC), led by Aidid and his rival Ali Mahdi, would result in serious fighting and vast swathes of Mogadishu would consequently destroyed as both factions attempted to exert control over the city. 

Both Ali Mahdi and Aidid claimed to lead national unity governments, and each vied to lead the reconstruction of the Somali state.

Somali National Alliance 
Aidids wing of the USC would morph into the Somalia National Alliance (SNA) or USC/SNA. During the spring and summer of 1992, Former President Siad Barres army attempted to retake Mogadishu,  but successful joint defence and counterattack by Aidids USC wing, the Somali Patriotic Movement (SPM), the Somali Southern National Movement (SSNM) and Somali Democratic Movement (SDM) (all united under the banner of the Somali Liberation Army) to push the last remnants of Barres troops out of southern Somalia into Kenya on June 16, 1992 would lead to the formation of the political union known as the Somali National Alliance. This absorption of different political organizations was critical to Aidid’s approach to taking the presidency.

As leader of the Somali National Alliance, Aidid, with presidential aspirations, expressed the goal of using the SNA as a base for working toward forming a national reconciliation government and claimed to also be aiming for an eventual multi-party democracy. To this end Aidid required and sought political agreements with the  only two remaining major factions, the Somali National Movement (SNM) and Somali Salvation Democratic Front (SSDF), to leave his main rival Ali Mahdi Mohamed isolated in an enclave in North Mogadishu.

Aidids grip on power in the SNA was fragile, as his ability to impose decisions on the organization was limited. A council of elders held decision making power for most significant issues and elections were held that threatened Aidids chairmanship.

United Nations Intervention 

In April 1992 the United Nations intervened in Somalia, creating UNOSOM I. United Nations Security Council Resolution 794 was unanimously passed on 3 December 1992, which approved a coalition led by the United States. Forming the Unified Task Force (UNITAF), the alliance was given the task of assuring security until humanitarian efforts were transferred to the UN. 

Aidid initially publicly opposed the deployment of United Nations forces to Somalia, but eventually relented. He and UN Secretary-General Boutros Boutros Ghali both despised one another. Before being Secretary-General, Boutros Ghali had been an Egyptian diplomat that had supported President Siad Barre against the USC in the late 80s and early 90s. 

In January 1993, Special Representative of the UN in Somalia, Ismat Kittani, requested the Aidid come to the Addis Abba Peace Conference set to be held in March.

Presidency declaration
Aidid subsequently declared himself President of Somalia in June 1995. However, his declaration received no international recognition, as his rival Ali Mahdi Muhammad had already been elected interim president at a conference in 1991 in Djibouti and recognized as such by the international community.

Death  
On 24 July 1996, Aidid and his men clashed with the forces of former allies Ali Mahdi Muhammad and Osman Ali Atto. Atto was a former supporter and financier of Aidid, and of the same subclan. Atto is alleged to have masterminded the defeat of Aidid.  Aidid suffered a gunshot wound in the ensuing battle. He later died from a heart attack on 1 August 1996, either during or after surgery to treat his injuries.

Family
During the leading up to the civil war, Aidid's wife Khadiga Gurhan sought asylum in Canada in 1989, taking their four children with her. Local media shortly afterwards alleged that she had returned to Somalia for a five-month stay while still receiving welfare payments. Gurhan admitted in an interview to collecting welfare and having briefly traveled to Somalia in late 1991. However, it was later brought to light that she had been granted landed immigrant status in June 1991, thereby making her a legal resident of Canada. Additionally, Aidid's rival President Barre had been overthrown in January of that year. This altogether ensured that Gurhan's five-month trip would not have undermined her initial 1989 claim of refugee status. An official probe by Canadian immigration officials into the allegations also concluded that she had obtained her landing papers through normal legal processes.

Hussein Mohamed Farrah, son of General Aidid, emigrated to the United States when he was 17 years old. Staying 16 years in the country, he eventually became a naturalized citizen and later a United States Marine who served in Somalia. Two days after his father's death, the Somali National Alliance declared Farrah as the new president, although he too was not internationally recognized as such.

Notes

References
 Drysdale, John. Whatever Happened to Somalia?: A Tale of Tragic Blunders London: HAAN Publishing. 1994.
 Bowden, Mark. Black Hawk Down: A Story of Modern War. Berkeley, California: Atlantic Monthly Press. March 1999.
 
 Lutz, David. Hannover Institute of Philosophical Research. The Ethics of American Military Policy in Africa (research paper). Front Royal, Virginia: Joint Services Conference on Professional Ethics. 2000.
 McKinley, James. 'How a U.S. Marine Became a Warlord in Somalia'. New York: The New York Times. 16 August 1996.

1934 births
1996 deaths
Battle of Mogadishu (1993)
Frunze Military Academy alumni
Somali National Alliance politicians
Somalian faction leaders
Somalian generals
United Somali Congress politicians
Ambassadors of Somalia to India